Skoblyakov is a Russian surname. Notable people with the surname include:

 Dmitri Skoblyakov (born 1980), Russian footballer, brother of Sergei
 Sergei Skoblyakov (born 1977), Russian footballer

Russian-language surnames